Sun Valley is an unincorporated community in Hancock County, West Virginia, United States.

References

Unincorporated communities in Hancock County, West Virginia
Unincorporated communities in West Virginia